Andreas Dahlén (born 11 December 1982 in Gävle) is a Swedish former professional footballer who played as a defender. He was a defensive specialist and could play at left back, central defender or defensive midfielder.

Career
Dahlén began his professional career 2003 with Brynäs IF before joining IFK Norrköping in January 2004. He played for Norrköping from January 2004 to June 2005. In July 2005, he signed for Umeå FC. He played for Umeå in few games before signing for Gefle IF in January 2007. On 10 December 2009, he announced his departure from Gefle and signed a two-and-a-half-year contract with Hansa Rostock. On 13 June 2010, he left Hansa Rostock and signed for FSV Frankfurt. After having only played one match for his club in the 2011–12 season, his contract was terminated by mutual consent on 16 January 2012.

References

External links

Living people
1982 births
People from Gävle
Sportspeople from Gävleborg County
Swedish footballers
Association football defenders
Allsvenskan players
Superettan players
2. Bundesliga players
IFK Norrköping players
Umeå FC players
Gefle IF players
FC Hansa Rostock players
FSV Frankfurt players
Djurgårdens IF Fotboll players
Åtvidabergs FF players
Swedish expatriate footballers
Swedish expatriate sportspeople in Germany
Expatriate footballers in Germany